My Gift to You is the second published album by Christchurch soprano Hayley Westenra. The album was released only in New Zealand and Australia. It was published by the Universal New Zealand label in 2001.

Westenra chose favourite Christmas and seasonal songs in this album, featuring guests such as Annie Crummer and Hayley's sister Sophie.

The album continued Westenra's commercial success in New Zealand. For the first time in her career she had an album certified platinum in its first week of release. The album peaked at number four on the New Zealand Album Chart.

Track listing

References

Hayley Westenra albums
2001 albums